The Minister for Racing is a minister in the government of New Zealand with responsibility for the regulation of the racing industry and betting services. The minister is also responsible for the New Zealand Racing Board, Racing Industry Transition Agency and Totalisator Agency Board (TAB).

The present Minister is Kieran McAnulty, a member of the Labour Party.

List of Ministers for Racing 
The following ministers have held the office of Minister for Racing.

Key

See also
New Zealand Racing Board
Totalisator Agency Board

Notes

References

Racing
Horse racing in New Zealand